The M37 highway is a highway in Turkmenistan. It is the Turkmenistan section of the European route E60 and Asian Highway AH5, which connects Brest, France to Irkeshtam, Kyrgyzstan on the border with the People's Republic of China. It connects most of the major cities in the country from Türkmenbaşy on the Caspian Sea on the west coast to Bukhara, Uzbekistan.

From Türkmenbaşy the highway proceeds east, passing through Jebel, Balkanabat, Gumdag, Bereket, Gyzylarbat, Bäherden, Gokdepe, Ashgabat, Gämi, Anew, Artyk, Kaka, Dushak, Tejen, Hanhowuz Reservoir, Mary, Bayramaly, crosses the Karakum Canal, proceeding north into the Karakum Desert of the Repetek Nature Reserve, passing Bagtyýarlyk şäherçesi, Turkmenabat, Farap, before crossing the Amu Darya and into Uzbekistan.

The first phase of the Ashgabat-Farap motorway ("autobahn") was completed in 2021. It is not clear whether this motorway will be designated M37, replacing the original M37.

References

External links
 Mapillary
 OpenStreetMap map of M37 highway in Turkmenistan

Roads in Turkmenistan
Central Asian highways